Hojai College, established on 11 July 1964, is a general degree college situated in Hojai, Assam. This college is affiliated with the Gauhati University. The college offers H.S. course and three-year degree courses in bachelor's degree of arts, science and commerce. Master's degree in Assamese was started from the academic session 2016–17. The educational institution also provides courses in Institute of Distance and Open Learning (IDOL) under Gauhati University, Krishna Kanta Handiqui State Open University (KKHSOU), and Indira Gandhi National Open University (IGNOU) courses.

From the academic session 2021-22 there will be all master's degree in all subjects

History 
In 1964, The Hojai College became a boon for the people living in Hojai. But, the pioneers of the creation of Hojai College had to face insurmountable hurdles on several fronts. But, the relentless efforts of a select band of far-sighted citizens and patronization, the establishment of college became a reality. It started with only 124 students in P.U. (Arts) and soon became popular in the southern part of Nagaon District for its high-quality education. Since its inception, this college has been guided by the concepts of excellence in academic and co-curricular aspects of students' life under the able guidance of the host of dedicated teachers.

Courses of study

Regular courses 
The regular courses in the college include:

 H.S Arts, H.S Commerce and H.S Science (2 years Course as per AHSEC regulation - Annual Pattern)
 B.A, B.Sc., B.Com. (3 years Degree Course - Semester System)
 M.A. in Assamese (2 years Course Semester System)

Distance courses 
The institute offers distance mode of education in postgraduate courses. They are mentioned below:

 Institute of Distance Learning & Open Learning (IDOL)
 Krishna Kanta Handique State Open University (KKHSOU)
 Indira Gandhi National Open University (IGNOU)

College hours and recent achievements 
Classes of Arts, Science and Commerce stream in the college are held in Day Shift. Major classes are held on the Day Shift only. The Day Shift starts at 9:15 A.M. and ends at 4:00 P.M. Morning Shift has also been introduced with the circular of the Government of Assam to cater to the increasing demand for seats. Admission to the Morning Shift is made for T.D.C Arts (General) and Science (General) Course only. Morning Shift starts from 7 A.M. and continues till 10 A.M.

The college has recently been upgraded to University under a bill passed by the Assam Assembly on 7 September 2017. The name of the college will be changed to Rabindranath Tagore University. It has also been accredited by NAAC with Grade B (2.71).

Academic departments

There are a total of eighteen (18) academic departments in the Hojai College across all streams i.e. Arts, Science, and Commerce. The departments include Assamese, Bengali, Economics, Education, English, Hindi, History, Manipuri, Commerce, Accountancy, Management, Political Science, Botany, Zoology, Chemistry, Mathematics, Physics, and Statistics. Each of the departments provides H.S as well as three years degree course (B.A, B.Sc., B.Com.) Following are the brief details of each department of Hojai College:

Physics: Established in 1987, the Department of Physics provides H.S course along with three year Degree course (B.Sc., Major, and General). 
Mathematics: The Department of Mathematics was established in 1964, which also offers H.S course and three year Degree course (B.Sc., Major, and General).
Chemistry: The Department of Chemistry was established in 1987. The research works done here are topical nature pertaining to Synthetic Chemistry, Phytochemistry, and Environmental Chemistry. This dept. also offers H.S course and three year Degree course (B.Sc., Major, and General).
Botany: The Department of Botany was also established in the 1987. This dept. provides H.S course and three year Degree course (B.Sc., Major, and General). 
Zoology: The Department of Zoology was established in 1987, but Degree Major course was initiated from the year 2002. This department also offers H.S course and three year Degree course (B.Sc., Major, and General). 
Statistics: The Department of Statistics was established in 1997. This department also offers H.S course and three year Degree course (B.A, B.Sc., B.Com. General). 
Assamese: The Department of Assamese is also one of the oldest departments in Hojai College. It offers H.S course and three year Degree course (B.A Major & General, M.A). 
Bengali: The Bengali Department is also one of the oldest departments in Hojai College. This department also offers H.S course and three year Degree course (B.A Major & General). 
 Hindi: The Department of Hindi was established in 1964 and is also one of the oldest departments. It offers H.S course and three year Degree course (B.A Major & General). 
English: The English Department was also established in 1964. This department also offers H.S course and three year Degree course (B.A, B.Sc., B.Com. Major a& General, and Pass Course). F
 Manipuri: The Manipuri Department was founded in 1983. This department also offers H.S course and three year Degree course (B.A General). 
History: The Department of History was founded in 1964 and Dr. H. K. Ghosal was the first Head of the department. This department also offers H.S course and three year Degree course (B.A Major & General). 
Education:  The Department of Education was established in 1964. This department also offers H.S course and three year Degree course (B.A Major & General).
Economics: The Department of Economics was also founded in 1964 as Akhil Bandhu the first Head of the department and retired as Vice-Principal in 1999. This department also offers H.S course and three year Degree course (B.A Major & General).
Political Science: The Department of Political Science was established in 1964. This department also offers H.S course and three year Degree course (B.A Major & General). 
Commerce: The Commerce Department was founded in 1974 while B.Com. courses were introduced in the year 1987. Now, this department also offers H.S course and three year Degree course (B.Com. General). 
 Management: Initially, there was no separate department for Management, it was run by Commerce Department. But, in 2002, it was founded as a separate Department and Dr. A.H. Choudhury as the first Head of the department. This department also offers H.S course and three year Degree course (B.A Major & General).
 Accountancy:  The Department of Accountancy was also founded in 2002 with L. Patgiri as the first Head of the department. This department also offers H.S course and three year Degree course (B.A Major & General).

References

External links
http://www.hojaicollege.edu.in

Universities and colleges in Assam
Colleges affiliated to Gauhati University
Educational institutions established in 1964
1964 establishments in Assam